The Rock of Souls (Spanish: El Peñón de las Ánimas) is a Mexican movie produced in 1943, directed by Miguel Zacarías and starring  Jorge Negrete and María Félix. It is the first movie to star María Félix, one of the legendary female stars of the Golden Age of Mexican cinema.

Plot
In a little town in Mexico, the rivalry between the families of Fernando Iturriaga (Jorge Negrete) and María Ángela Valdivia (María Félix) for the domain of a property known as El Peñón de las Ánimas prevents the love between the two young lovers.

Curiosities
It was the first movie of the legendary María Félix. For the movie, Jorge Negrete had requested that his girlfriend, the actress Gloria Marín be his costar; however, Félix was selected by the director, which led to a series of altercations between the couple. Ten years later they got married.

Cast
 Jorge Negrete as Fernando Iturriaga
 María Félix as María Ángela Valdivia
 René Cardona as Manuel
 Miguel Ángel Ferriz as Don Braulio
 Carlos López Moctezuma as Felipe, María Ángela's brother
 Virginia Manzano as Rosa
 Conchita Gentil Arcos as Madame
 Manuel Dondé as Macario
 Roberto Cañedo
 Julio Ahuet
 Hernán Vera
 Paco Astol
 Paco Martínez
 Armando Sáenz
 Linda Christian
 Cecilia Leger as Modista 
 Manuel Pozos as Señor gobernador
 Humberto Rodríguez as Invitado al baile

References

Bibliography
 Baugh, Scott L. Latino American Cinema: An Encyclopedia of Movies, Stars, Concepts, and Trends. ABC-CLIO, 2012.

External links

1940s Spanish-language films
Mexican black-and-white films
1943 films
1943 romantic drama films
Films directed by Miguel Zacarías
Films scored by Manuel Esperón
Mexican romantic drama films
1940s Mexican films